Calophasia is a genus of moths of the family Noctuidae.

Species
 Calophasia almoravida Graslin, 1863
 Calophasia angularis (Chrétien, 1911)
 Calophasia barthae Wagner, 1929
 Calophasia hamifera Staudinger, 1863
 Calophasia lunula – toadflax brocade Hufnagel, 1766
 Calophasia opalina Esper, 1793
 Calophasia platyptera Esper, 1788
 Calophasia sinaica (Wiltshire, 1948)

References
 Calophasia at Markku Savela's Lepidoptera and Some Other Life Forms
 Natural History Museum Lepidoptera genus database

Cuculliinae
Noctuoidea genera